Peng Lin (born 4 April 1995) is a water polo player for China. 

She was part of the Chinese team at the 2015 World Aquatics Championships, the 2016 FINA Women's Water Polo World League, the 2016 Summer Olympics, and the 2017 World Aquatics Championships.

See also
 China women's Olympic water polo team records and statistics
 List of women's Olympic water polo tournament goalkeepers

References

External links
 

1995 births
Living people
Place of birth missing (living people)
Chinese female water polo players
Water polo goalkeepers
Olympic water polo players of China
Water polo players at the 2016 Summer Olympics
Water polo players at the 2020 Summer Olympics
Asian Games medalists in water polo
Water polo players at the 2014 Asian Games
Water polo players at the 2018 Asian Games
Asian Games gold medalists for China
Medalists at the 2014 Asian Games
Medalists at the 2018 Asian Games
21st-century Chinese women